Little Rockies National Forest was established by the U.S. Forest Service in Montana on March 2, 1907 with .  On July 1, 1908 the entire forest was combined with Little Belt, Snowy Mountains and Highwood Mountains National Forests to establish Jefferson National Forest (Montana) and the name was discontinued. The entire Jefferson National Forest was later consolidated with the Lewis and Clark National Forest.  The former Forest Service lands in the LIttle Rockies are now administered by the Bureau of Land Management.

See also
 List of forests in Montana

References

External links
Forest History Society
Forest History Society:Listing of the National Forests of the United States Text from Davis, Richard C., ed. Encyclopedia of American Forest and Conservation History. New York: Macmillan Publishing Company for the Forest History Society, 1983. Vol. II, pp. 743-788.

Former National Forests of Montana
1907 establishments in Montana
Protected areas established in 1907
Protected areas disestablished in 1908
1908 disestablishments in Montana